Tetragon Financial Group Limited ("TFG") is a closed-ended investment company which is traded on the Euronext exchange in Amsterdam and on the Specialist Fund Segment of the main market of the London Stock Exchange. The firm's strategy is to provide stable returns to its investors through a wide range of credit, equity, interest rate and real estate cycles. Tetragon invests in a broad range of assets, including public and private equities and credit (including distressed securities and structured credit), convertible bonds, real estate, venture capital, infrastructure, bank loans and TFG Asset Management, a diversified alternative asset management business. The company's investment manager is Tetragon Financial Management LP ("TFM"). TFG's Polygon business is a member of SBAI (the "Standard Board for Alternative Investments"), and AIMA ("Alternative Investment Management Association"). TFG was founded on June 23, 2005.

History

Tetragon Financial Group was founded in 2005.   It is registered in Saint Peter Port, Guernsey in the Channel Islands and headquartered in the United Kingdom.  In 2007, TFG went public with an IPO, selling at $10/share, as an Amsterdam-listed closed-end investment company on Euronext.   In 2010, Tetragon acquired Lyon Capital Management LLC (“LCM”)  and established a joint venture with John Carrafiell, Sonny Kalsi and Fred Schmidt of GreenOak Real Estate.  In October 2012, TFG purchased Polygon Management  (“Polygon”).  In 2013, Polygon was listed as one of the 50 largest hedge fund managers in Europe by The Hedge Fund Journal. In 2014, Tetragon acquired Equitix, an investor, developer and long-term fund manager of infrastructure and energy-efficiency assets in the UK. Equitix has raised £4.7 billion of equity, including managed accounts. In 2015, Tetragon established Tetragon Credit Partners; an asset manager. Also in 2015, Hawke's Point, an asset management company focused on the mining and resource sectors, was formed under the TFG Asset Management umbrella. In 2019, the GreenOak real estate joint venture was merged with Bentall Kennedy to create a $47 billion global real estate platform called BentallGreenOak; Tetragon remains an investor in the business.

Leadership

Tetragon's investment manager is Tetragon Financial Management (TFM). TFM's investment committee includes Reade Griffith, Paddy Dear and Stephen Prince, the head of TFG Management.

Business Model

TFG has an investment portfolio with a NAV of $1.8 billion.  TFG Asset Management consists of three main investment managers: the Polygon Global Partners $1.4 billion; LCM, a $4.9 billion CLO manager; and GreenOak, a real estate investment firm managing $4.1 billion.

Awards

Environmental, Social and Governance (ESG) policy

The investment manager of Tetragon is TFM, which is responsible for Tetragon's ESG policy. Tetragon takes into consideration ESG information when considering investments along with other economic and financial data.

Legal Action

In July 2011, Daniel Silverstein, a shareholder of TFG, sued the firm. The suit was later dismissed in February, 2012.  In June 2013, Omega Overseas Partners filed a lawsuit against the firm. On August 7, 2014, in an opinion by Judge Richard J. Sullivan, the Court dismissed the Action in its entirety.

External links
 www.tetragoninv.com

References

Private equity portfolio companies
Financial services companies established in 2005